A combined cycle powered locomotive is a patented idea to use two primary movers, a gas turbine with a steam turbine to gain the efficiency of a combined cycle power plant or a combined gas and steam engine.  Steam locomotives were tested in the past but were not ideal for low speeds, and gas turbine locomotives (GTELs) were used by Union Pacific until the 1970s.  Combined cycle power uses the heat from the gas turbine to make steam from the water to turn a steam turbine, instead of that heat getting exhausted out and wasted. Engine efficiency for combined cycle can achieve 60% compared to diesel motors' 45% efficiency. The gas and steam turbines would turn their separate generators and the steam turbine would have a clutch between it and its generator because steam power is not easily adjustable.  Compressed natural gas or liquefied natural gas would be in one fuel tank, and water would be in another storage tank for the steam, and the Rankine cycle could condense most of the steam back to the water to put back into the water tank to repeat the cycle for the steam turbine. Current diesel electric locomotives such as the GE Evolution Series with a cab could still be the lead cab, pusher, and distributed power; with the combined cycle powered locomotive as a slug.

See also
 Turbine-electric powertrain
 Schnabel car

References

External links
 Researching an Air-Steam Combined-cycle Locomotive

Steam locomotives
Gas turbine locomotives
Steam vehicles
Freight transport
Locomotive engines